On Nature and Grace is an anti-Pelagian book by Augustine of Hippo written in AD 415. It is a response to Pelagius's 414 book On Nature. Before this work, Augustine did not seem to see Pelagius as a heretic, but On Nature and Grace seems to be a turning point in the Pelagian controversy. The work does not mention Pelagius by name, but by responding to De natura, Augustine for the first time engages Pelagius as an opponent.

References

Sources 

5th-century books
Works by Augustine of Hippo
Pelagianism